Alchemilla jamesonii, synonym Lachemilla jamesonii, is a species of plant in the family Rosaceae. It is native to Bolivia, Ecuador and Peru.

Conservation
Under the synonym Lachemilla jamesonii, Alchemilla jamesonii was assessed as "vulnerable" in the 1998 IUCN Red List, where it is said to be native only to Ecuador. Plants of the World Online gives it a wider distribution.

References

jamesonii
Flora of Bolivia
Flora of Ecuador
Flora of Peru
Taxonomy articles created by Polbot